Michael Dean Crapo (born May 20, 1951) is an American lawyer and politician serving as the senior United States senator from Idaho, a seat he has held since 1999. A member of the Republican Party, Crapo previously served as the U.S. representative for Idaho's 2nd congressional district from 1993 to 1999. He is the dean of Idaho's congressional delegation, having served since 1993.

Born in Idaho Falls, Crapo is a graduate of Brigham Young University and Harvard Law School. He practiced law in his home city throughout the 1980s, while also maintaining an active role in local Republican politics. His brother Terry Crapo was majority leader in the Idaho House of Representatives from 1968 to 1972 and an influential political figure until his death from leukemia in 1982. After his brother's death, Crapo was elected to the Idaho Senate in 1984. He served as Senate president pro tempore from 1988 to 1992.

Crapo was elected to an open seat in Congress in 1992, representing Idaho's 2nd congressional district in the House of Representatives. After three terms in the House, he ran for the open seat in the U.S. Senate in 1998 when Dirk Kempthorne vacated it to run for Idaho governor. Crapo was elected with 70% of the vote, and became the first member of the Church of Jesus Christ of Latter-day Saints to represent Idaho in the Senate. In 2004, he defeated his only opponent, write-in Democratic candidate Scott McClure, with 99% of the vote. He was reelected in 2010 with 71% of the vote, and in 2016 with 66% of the vote.

Early life and education
Crapo was born in Idaho Falls, Idaho, the son of Melba (née Olsen) and George Lavelle Crapo. He earned a B.A. in political science from Brigham Young University in 1973 and a J.D. from Harvard Law School in 1977.

Early political career

After graduating from law school, Crapo served for one year as a law clerk to Judge James M. Carter of the U.S. Court of Appeals for the Ninth Circuit. He then returned to Idaho to practice as a lawyer, joining his brother Terry Crapo's law firm of Holden Kidwell Hahn & Crapo in Idaho Falls. In the 1980s, he became active in the Republican Party's campaigns for seats in the state legislature. His brother served in Idaho House of Representatives for four years as majority leader (1968 to 1972) and was considered a rising star in Idaho politics. After Terry's death from leukemia in 1982, Mike ran for an open seat in the Idaho Senate. He was elected to the State Senate in 1984, where he served until 1992. In 1988, Senate President pro tempore Jim Risch unexpectedly lost reelection to the Idaho Senate, and Crapo was elected by his colleagues to the president's position. He served as senate president pro tempore from 1988 to 1992.

On January 27, 1989, Crapo served as acting governor of Idaho for 12 hours while Governor Cecil D. Andrus was out of the state testifying before Congress and Lieutenant Governor Butch Otter was out of the state on business for his employer, Simplot. Andrus, a Democrat, left Crapo a note saying, "Don't do anything I wouldn't do. ... P.S. The chair is comfortable, isn't it?"

Crapo was elected to Congress in 1992, representing Idaho's 2nd congressional district in the United States House of Representatives. He served three terms from 1993 to 1999. He was elected to the U.S. Senate in 1998.

U.S. Senate

Elections
Crapo was elected to the U.S. Senate in 1998. He succeeded fellow Republican Dirk Kempthorne, who retired after one term to run for governor. In his Senate bid, as in his House campaigns, Crapo's campaign made signs that had a macron placed over the "a" in his name (Crāpo) to indicate its correct pronunciation ("Cray-poe").

Crapo was reelected in 2004 with 99.2% of the vote, with the other .8% going to a write-in candidate, Democrat Scott McClure.

In 2010, Crapo was reelected to a third term with 71% of the vote, defeating Democratic nominee P. Tom Sullivan and Constitution Party nominee Randy Bergquist.

In 2016, Crapo was reelected to a fourth term with 66% of the vote, defeating Democratic nominee Jerry Sturgill and Constitution Party nominee Ray Writz. In October 2016, after the Donald Trump and Billy Bush recording came to light, Crapo said he would not vote for Trump. He later reversed that decision.

Tenure

1990s
On February 12, 1999, Crapo was one of 50 senators to vote to convict of impeachable offenses and to remove Bill Clinton from office.

2000s
In the 111th Congress, Crapo served on the following Senate committees: Banking, Housing and Urban Development; Budget; Environment and Public Works; Indian Affairs; and Finance. He co-chairs the Senate Nuclear Caucus, the Canada-U.S. Inter-parliamentary Group (IPG); the COPD (Chronic Obstructive Pulmonary Disease) Caucus, which he founded; and the Congressional Sportsmen's Caucus.

Crapo became the state's senior senator when the 111th United States Congress convened on January 3, 2009, succeeding Larry Craig, who decided not to seek reelection. At the convening of the 112th United States Congress, Crapo ranked 39th in seniority in the Senate.

He opposed President Barack Obama's health reform legislation, voted against the Patient Protection and Affordable Care Act in December 2009, and voted against the Health Care and Education Reconciliation Act of 2010.

2010s

In April 2013, Crapo was one of 46 senators to vote against a bill that would have expanded background checks for all gun buyers. He voted with 40 Republicans and 5 Democrats to stop passage of the bill.

The New York Times noted that Crapo became "something of a hero among advocates of bipartisanship" for his involvement in the "Gang of Six".

In 2017, Crapo was one of 22 senators to sign a letter to President Donald Trump urging him to withdraw the United States from the Paris Agreement.

Crapo's view on senatorial responsibilities for Supreme Court nominees has evolved. Of President George W. Bush's 2006 nomination of Samuel Alito, Crapo said in a press release, "All of the President's nominees deserve up-and-down votes and not efforts to obstruct judicial nominees for political purposes. Judges are not politicians, and hopefully, Judge Alito's nomination will put an end to the politics which have crept into the nomination process." By contrast, in 2016, his press release regarding President Obama's nomination of Merrick Garland to replace the late Antonin Scalia said:

The Constitution gives the President the right to make nominations to the Supreme Court, with the advice and consent of the Senate. As part of its role in this process, the Senate may, at its discretion, withhold consent. The next Supreme Court justice will make decisions that affect every American and shape our nation's legal landscape for decades. Therefore, the current Supreme Court vacancy should be filled by an individual nominated by the next President of the United States.

2020s
In September 2020, with less than two months to the next presidential election, Crapo voiced support for an immediate Senate vote on Trump's nominee to fill the Supreme Court vacancy caused by the death of justice Ruth Bader Ginsburg, once a "well-qualified candidate" was put forth.

For his tenure as the chairman of the Senate Banking, Housing, and Urban Affairs Committee during the 116th Congress, Crapo was given an "F" grade from the non-partisan Lugar Center's Congressional Oversight Hearing Index.

On January 6, 2021, Crapo was participating in the certification of the 2021 United States Electoral College vote count when Trump supporters attacked the United States Capitol. In response, he called for "perpetrators" to be "prosecuted to the fullest extent of the law". He opposed removing Trump from office, saying that the "country is too divided" and that invoking the Twenty-fifth Amendment to the United States Constitution "would only make matters worse".

Committee assignments
 Committee on Banking, Housing, and Urban Affairs 
 Subcommittee on Housing, Transportation and Community Development
 Subcommittee on Financial Institutions
 Subcommittee on Securities, Insurance and Investment
 Committee on the Budget
 Committee on Finance (Ranking Member)
Subcommittee on Health Care
 Subcommittee on Energy, Natural Resources, and Infrastructure
 Subcommittee on International Trade, Customs, and Global Competitiveness

Caucus memberships
 International Conservation Caucus
 Senate Diabetes Caucus
 Senate Nuclear Cleanup Caucus (co-chair)
 Senate Renewables and Energy Efficiency Caucus (co-chair)
 Sportsmen's Caucus (co-chair)
 Western Water Caucus
 Zero Capital Gains Tax Caucus
 Senate Republican Conference

Political positions
Crapo is considered politically conservative. The American Conservative Union's Center for Legislative Accountability gives him a lifetime conservative rating of 91.30. Americans for Democratic Action gave him a liberalism score of five in 2020.

Abortion

Crapo is anti-abortion. In 1998, he supported a bill that made it illegal for minors to cross state lines to get abortions in order to avoid parental consent laws. In 2009, he voted to restrict UN funding for population control policies. Crapo praised the overturning of Roe v. Wade in June 2022.

Energy

Crapo is a proponent of nuclear energy. He supports the nuclear energy projects at the Idaho National Laboratory (INL) and helped work on the nuclear-related Senate bills known as the Nuclear Energy Innovation Capabilities Act (NEICA) and the Nuclear Energy Innovation and Modernization Act (NEIMA). The former bill helped establish the National Reactor Innovation Center at the INL.

Gun law
In 2012, Crapo said that more gun control regulations would not curb violence in the United States. He also said that he supported efforts to improve mental health access rather than more gun laws.

As of 2013, Crapo had an "A+" rating from the National Rifle Association (NRA) for his voting record on causes supported by the NRA. The same year, he joined 12 other senators vowing to filibuster any attempts by Democrats to introduce additional gun control regulations in the wake of the Sandy Hook Elementary School shooting. Crapo also supported legislation to make open carry legal in National Parks.

In January 2017, the NRA praised Crapo for introducing the Hearing Protection Act, which would make access to gun silencers easier.

In response to the 2017 Las Vegas shooting, Crapo called for "solidarity" and praised first responders. The Hearing Protection Act bill was tabled in wake of the shooting.

United States Capitol attack
On May 28, 2021, Crapo voted against creating an independent commission to investigate the 2021 United States Capitol attack.

Veteran Affairs
On August 2, 2022, Crapo was one of only 11 senators to vote against the Promise to Address Comprehensive Toxics (PACT) Act, a bill to expand VA health care and benefits for veterans exposed to burn pits and other toxic substances.

Personal life
Crapo married Susan Diane Hasleton in June 1974, and they have five children. He is a member of the Church of Jesus Christ of Latter-day Saints.

Crapo was diagnosed with prostate cancer in 1999 and underwent a radical prostatectomy in January 2000. He had a full recovery and was declared cancer-free. In 2005 he had a recurrence of prostate cancer, and underwent a series of radiation treatments. He has become active in advocating early detection tests for cancer and other treatable diseases. Crapo has also pushed to create a federal Office of Men's Health.

Crapo is an Eagle Scout, awarded in 1966. He received the Distinguished Eagle Scout Award (DESA) in 2000.

On January 4, 2013, Crapo pleaded guilty to DUI in connection with a December 2012 incident and received the standard punishment for a first-time offender in Virginia. He issued a public apology just after his arrest, and various Idaho media outlets criticized him in light of his religion's temperance tenets.

Electoral history

References

Further reading
 Anatomy of a Press Release, editorial, Times-News (Idaho), October 10, 2011

External links 

 Senator Mike Crapo official U.S. Senate website
 Mike Crapo for Senate
 
 
 

|-

|-

|-

|-

|-

|-

|-

|-

1951 births
21st-century American politicians
Brigham Young University alumni
Mike
Harvard Law School alumni
1982 Idaho elections
1984 Idaho elections
1986 Idaho elections
1988 Idaho elections
1990 Idaho elections
1992 Idaho elections
1994 Idaho elections
1998 Idaho elections
Idaho lawyers
Republican Party Idaho state senators
Latter Day Saints from Idaho
Living people
People from Idaho Falls, Idaho
Republican Party members of the United States House of Representatives from Idaho
Republican Party United States senators from Idaho
American gun rights activists
Idaho politicians convicted of crimes